Linda, portrayed by Linda Bove, was a character on the children's program Sesame Street. Bove, who is deaf, appeared on Sesame Street with the National Theater of the Deaf and made her debut on the show in Episode 0243, which aired in April 1971. Initially appearing on a sporadic basis, she became a regular member of the cast in 1975, and continued to appear until 2002. In 2019, Linda returned to the franchise in the television special Sesame Street's 50th Anniversary Celebration, 17 years after her last appearance.

This deaf character communicated only in sign language but interacted positively with other members of the Sesame Street community as a normal citizen and resident of Sesame Street. The person who most often acted as her interpreter was Bob; eventually, he and Linda were portrayed as being in a romantic relationship. Linda made her living as a librarian, and as such she also had an assistant, Micki (Micki Barnett). Micki would read the stories to the children, while Linda communicated them in sign language.

The staff writers at Sesame Street were initially unsure of how to write for her. Linda Bove explained, "When I joined the cast I found the writers would write about 'How would a deaf person do this?' 'How does a deaf person do that?' And it was just related to my deafness and it didn't feel like they were treating me as a person. I found my character one-dimensional and kind of boring. It showed how brave a deaf person was to do this and that in everyday life. I said it was no big deal. I have a sense of humor; why don't you show that? I can be angry over something. Show that I can have a relationship with another person. Maybe a love relationship with Bob. It's not perfect, but... We do have misunderstandings over sign language, make fun of it, and show the funny side of it. It's OK."

Linda also appeared in numerous inserts and sketches, notably the famous silent sketches where Maria (Sonia Manzano) would play Charlie Chaplin and Linda would often play a supporting role, either as a pretty woman or as a second Chaplin if two were required for a particular sketch.

References

Sesame Street human characters
Fictional deaf characters
Television characters introduced in 1971
American female characters in television
Fictional librarians